Onnum Mindatha Bharya is a 1984 Indian Malayalam-language film, directed by Balu Kiriyath and produced by Thiruppathi Chettiyar. The film stars Mammootty, Jalaja, Viji and Menaka. The film's musical score is by Raghu Kumar.

Cast

Mammootty
Jalaja
Viji
Menaka
Prathapachandran
Sukumaran
Baby Geethu Antony
Baby Shalini
Balan K. Nair
Kunchan
Kuthiravattam Pappu
Nithya

Soundtrack
The music was composed by Raghu Kumar with lyrics by Balu Kiriyath.

References

External links
 

1984 films
1980s Malayalam-language films
Films scored by Raghu Kumar